Wambaix is a commune in the Nord department in northern France. Wambaix station has rail connections to Douai, Cambrai and Saint-Quentin.

Heraldry

Population

See also
Communes of the Nord department

References

Communes of Nord (French department)